Network complexity is the number of nodes and alternative paths that exist within a computer network, as well as the variety of communication media, communications equipment, protocols, and hardware and software platforms found in the network.

Simple network: A small LAN with no alternative paths, a single communication protocol, and identical hardware and software platforms across nodes would be classified as a simple network.

Complex network: an enterprise-wide network that uses multiple communication media and communication protocols to interconnect geographically distributed networks with dissimilar hardware and software platforms would be classified as a complex network.

See also
Connectivity (graph theory)

References

Complexity